Cerrigceinwen is a hamlet in the  community of Llangristiolus, Ynys Môn, Wales.

References

See also
List of localities in Wales by population

Villages in Anglesey